David Baxter may refer to:

Sir David Baxter, 1st Baronet (1793–1872), Scottish linen manufacturer and philanthropist
David Baxter (footballer) (1910–1979), Australian rules footballer
David Baxter (poker player), American poker player
David S. Baxter (born 1955), member of the First Quorum of the Seventy of The Church of Jesus Christ of Latter-day Saints
David Baxter (drummer), American Metal drummer
David Baxter (sprinter) (1977–2010), Australian athlete